Despite Venstre having failed to become the largest party in Assens Municipality for all Danish general elections since the 2007 municipal reform
, they became the biggest party in both the 2013 Assens Municipal Election and the 2017 Assens Municipal Election.

Søren Steen Andersen from Venstre was seeking a third term for this election. This was announced in September 2020, when Venstre voted in favor of it. 

In the election, Venstre would once again become the biggest party with 13 seats. The parties of the traditional blue bloc would win 18 of 29 seats. On December 1, 2021, it was announced that the Social Democrats, Conservatives and Venstre had made a new constitution, remarkbly without the Green Left, who left the constitution after one of their members left the party in protest.  4 days later, it was announced that the Social Democrats also had left the constitution negotiations. This meant that only Venstre and the Conservatives were back. However they had 16 seats and maintained a majority.  Then on 8 December, 2021, it was confirmed that Søren Steen Andersen had secured a third term.

Electoral system
For elections to Danish municipalities, a number varying from 9 to 31 are chosen to be elected to the municipal council. The seats are then allocated using the D'Hondt method and a closed list proportional representation.
Assens Municipality had 29 seats in 2021

Unlike in Danish General Elections, in elections to municipal councils, electoral alliances are allowed.

Electoral alliances 

Electoral Alliance 1

Electoral Alliance 2

Electoral Alliance 3

Electoral Alliance 4

Results

Notes

References 

Assens